Glanidium is a genus of driftwood catfishes found in South America.

Species
There are currently 7 recognized species in this genus:
 Glanidium albescens Lütken, 1874
 Glanidium botocudo Sarmento-Soares & Martins-Pinheiro, 2013 
 Glanidium catharinensis P. Miranda-Ribeiro, 1962
 Glanidium cesarpintoi R. Ihering (pt), 1928
 Glanidium leopardum (Hoedeman, 1961)
 Glanidium melanopterum A. Miranda-Ribeiro, 1918
 Glanidium ribeiroi Haseman, 1911

References

Auchenipteridae
Fish of South America
Catfish genera
Taxa named by Christian Frederik Lütken